Cacostola volvula is a species of beetle in the family Cerambycidae. It was described by Johan Christian Fabricius in 1781. It is known from Bolivia, French Guiana and Brazil.

References

Cacostola
Beetles described in 1781